This is a list of newspapers in Kosovo:

Major newspapers
Kosova Press ('Independent News Agency KosovaPress') is first News Agency on Kosovo. The news agency Kosova Press was established on January 4, 1999. Since that time, it has published information in these languages: Albanian, English, German and French. It currently publishes in Albanian and English.
 Koha Ditore ('Daily Time') claims it is independent, but the owner Veton Surroi was the leader of the Reformist Party ORA. It was the only newspaper published before 1999. Koha Ditore is considered the most serious newspaper in Kosovo.
 Gazeta Express ('Express newspaper') is an independent online newsmedia with most visits in the country. The director of Gazeta Express Berat Buzhala  is a former (PDK) MP . Owned by among others mobile operator IPKO. The paper has been accused by some people and organizations in Kosovo of Islamophobia.
 Fol Drejt independent online newspaper.
Kosova24 ('Kosova 24') is an independent newsmedia based in Prizren, owned by Kosova 24 SH.P.K.
Shqip.com ('Shqip.com') is an independent newsmedia based in Prishtina, owned by Albmedia Group L.L.C
 Bota Sot ('World Today') Pro-Democratic League of Kosovo (LDK). One of the few Kosovar newspapers distributed in many Western countries.
 Epoka e Re ('The New Epoch') pro-VETËVENDOSJE!
 Kosova Sot ('Kosovo Today') is Pro-Democratic Party of Kosovo (PDK). Claims to have the highest circulation. 
 Lajm ('News') pro-New Kosovo Alliance (AKR) owned by the Kosovo Albanian businessman and politician Behgjet Pacolli. Tabloid.
 Teleshkronja Post independent News and Media website based in Drenas (Ex-Glogoc) owned by Teleshkronja Post news company.

Historical titles
 Tan, Turkish-language weekly newspaper published from 1969 to 1999

See also
 Media of Kosovo

Notes

References

Newspapers
Kosovo